Castelfranco Veneto railway station serves the town and comune of Castelfranco Veneto, in the Veneto region, northeastern Italy.

Opened in 1877, the station is a junction of three lines, the Trento–Venice railway, the Vicenza–Treviso railway and the Calalzo–Padua railway, respectively.  As such, it is one of the busiest railway junctions in the region.

The station is currently owned by Rete Ferroviaria Italiana (RFI).  The commercial area of the passenger building is managed by Centostazioni.  Train services to and from the station are operated by Trenitalia.  Each of these companies is a subsidiary of Ferrovie dello Stato (FS), Italy's state-owned rail company.

Features
The passenger building is a large three storey structure.  Passenger services inside the building include ticketing, a waiting area, and a bar, all on the ground floor.

There are seven tracks running through the station, all of them equipped with platforms connected by a subway.  Each platform has a shelter made of iron.

The goods yard has several tracks and a building, and is still partly used.  In future, goods movements at the station will probably increase, because of a recent decision to dispose of old wooden sleepers by transporting them north to Sweden.

Train services
The station is served by the following service(s):

High speed services (Frecciabianca) Milan - Verona - Vicenza - Treviso - Udine
Regional services (Treno regionale) Vicenza - Citadella - Castelfranco Veneto - Treviso
Regional services (Treno regionale) Padua - Castelfranco Veneto - Treviso
Regional services (Treno regionale) Vicenza - Padua - Castelfranco Veneto - Montebelluna - Belluno - Ponte nelle Alpi-Polpet - Calalzo-Pieve di Cadore-Cortina
Regional services (Treno regionale) Padua - Castelfranco Veneto - Montebelluna
Regional services (Treno regionale) Bassano del Grappa - Castelfranco Veneto - Venice

Passenger and train movements
The station has about 3.2 million passenger movements each year.

References

External links

History and pictures of Castelfranco Veneto railway station 

This article is based upon a translation of the Italian language version as at December 2010.

Railway stations in Veneto
Railway stations opened in 1877
1877 establishments in Italy
Railway stations in Italy opened in the 19th century